The Dolder Grand (formerly known as Grand Hotel Dolder) is a 5 star superior hotel in the Swiss city of Zürich.

The hotel is connected to central Zurich by road, and by the Dolderbahn rack railway, which has its upper terminus next to the hotel complex.

History 

The Dolder Grand Hotel & Curhaus was built between 1897 and 1899, to a design by the architect  for the restaurateur Heinrich Hürlimann. Hürlimann had previously developed the nearby Dolder Waldhaus hotel, also designed by Gros, and the Dolderbahn to serve it. The Dolder Grand opened on 10 May 1899, and was extended in 1924 and 1964.

In 2001, Urs Schwarzenbach became the majority shareholder, and in 2004 the hotel closed for an extensive renovation, reopening on 3 April 2008. The renovation and enlargement were led by Norman Foster and cost SFr 440 million. The restoration maintained the original appearance from 1899, and all the extensions added after that date were demolished. Two new wings were added, adjacent to the old building, whilst two additional floors were added below the existing building.

Before the hotel opened for guests, it had free open days when the public could visit the hotel on predefined paths. The people were waiting up to an hour to enter the new rooms.

On 29 March 2019, Dolder Hotel AG announced that Dolder Grand guests could pay their bills with Bitcoin , making it the first Swiss luxury hotel to accept the cryptocurrency as payment. The payment solution is provided and operated by Bitcoin Suisse, which converts Bitcoin into Swiss francs, thereby eliminating any currency risk for the hotel.

References

External links 

 The Hotel Homepage
 The Homepage of the owner, The Dolder Resort

Hotels in Zürich
Tourist attractions in Zürich